Arafel may refer to:

Arafel, a Hebrew word (ערפל), meaning "fog;" generally used in reference to the Apocalypse
Arafel, a fictional nation in Robert Jordan's Wheel of Time fantasy books
Arafel (Cherryh), a Siddhe fairy in C. J. Cherryh's Ealdwood fantasy stories
Arafel, A Folk Black Metal band from Tel Aviv, Israel
Arafel (Dune), the prophesied destruction of mankind in Frank Herbert's Dune universe